Nick Wolfe is a fictional character from the universe of the Highlander franchise, appearing in the spinoff series Highlander: The Raven, portrayed by actor Paul Johansson. He is an Immortal.

Nick has an older brother, who was 4 when Nick was adopted. Has a tattoo on his rear, learned to dance in the East Side Gym, and went to Law School.

History
Nick Wolfe is handsome, athletic, a touch cynical, quick-witted and able to think on his feet. He comes from a blue-collar background and was raised in an urban environment. His father was probably a shop steward in a factory, his mother taught second grade. He has an older brother as well as a younger sister. Nick did well in school, excelling in scholastics, athletics, and girls. He earned an athletic scholarship to Stanford, but a blown knee ended a football career and his free ride.

Nick quit college and drifted for a while before signing on as a deckhand on a tanker. He ended up in Marseille, where his pride and his tendency to get into bar fights transitioned to a turn at professional boxing. A few months later, a date with a future light-heavyweight champ taught him that boxing should not be his chosen vocation. But his European exodus wasn’t a total loss. He picked up more than a working knowledge of French.

Joining the police force seemed a natural for Nick, as did marrying Lauren Donovan, a beautiful young debutante from the right side of the tracks. Though the chemistry was still there, their lifestyles were too different. Lauren could no more accept the life of a cop’s wife than Nick could accept a job as a private investigator in her father’s prestigious law firm.  The marriage dissolved. Later, Nick would reunite briefly with Lauren in Paris, but that ended in tragedy. For a while, Nick contemplated working his way through law school. But the more time he spent as a cop, the more he realized how little the legal system had to do with justice. So he worked his way up on the Force, earning his Detective First Class stripes and the respect of the cops on the line.

The cop and the thief
The defining moment of his life is the moment his partner, Claudia Hoffman, died and Amanda walked into his life.  From that point on, nothing was the same. He quit the Force and walked away from a promotion rather than lie about his partner’s death. He started over by working for his friend Bert Myers in an international security consulting firm and helping oversee Bert's European interests which include co-ownership of a bar in Paris with Amanda. The bar sits on Holy Ground and is named Sanctuary.

He is a man who believes in justice and the promise he made to his dead partner’s memory. He is proud, sometimes overly so, honest, determined, and intolerant of fools. He fights his attraction to Amanda more because of her history as a thief than because of her Immortality. He has his own standards, and if he has a fault, it is that he holds to them rigidly, no matter what the cost, even if it means his life. He can be prone to charging forward without seeing all of the complications, especially where his heart is involved.

Intrigued by Nick, Amanda revealed her immortality to him and he became the new man in her life. He was there to help her with her struggle, but sometimes added to it. They argued constantly at a regular basis, but always managed to remain friends and partners. Together, Nick and Amanda solved numerous cases, some involving Immortals, some not.

The Immortal
In the series final episode, Nick was poisoned by an Immortal enemy of Amanda's named Evan Peyton. Believing that he was dying, Nick used up nearly all his energy to shoot out the projector that Peyton was using to project multiple images of himself, thus enabling Amanda to take Peyton's head. After the Quickening, Amanda ran to where Nick lay dying, asked Nick for his forgiveness, took his gun, and shot Nick to trigger his immortality. When Nick woke up, he became angry with Amanda for not telling him about his immortality and because it wasn't her choice to make; she, in typical fashion, thought he'd be happy about being able to live forever. To Amanda's shock, Nick walked away from her, believing that If There Can Only Be One, there is no room for loving another immortal.

It is important to note that Nick's experiences with other immortals have not been very favorable. Prior to his First Death, Nick beheaded two immortals, one by using the glass in a glass factory, and the other using Amanda's sword. The latter Quickening went to Amanda.

Appearances
Raven Episodes - "Reborn", "Full Disclosure", "Bloodlines", "Immunity", "So Shall Ye Reap", "Birthright", "Crime and Punishment", "The Unknown Soldier", "Cloak and Dagger", "Passion Play", "The Devil You Know", "A Matter of Time", "The French Connection", "The Rogue", "Inferno", "The Frame", "Love and Death", "Thick as Thieves", "The Manipulator", "The Ex-Files", "War and Peace", "Dead on Arrival"

References

External links

Highlander (franchise) characters
Fictional characters with immortality
Fictional police officers
Television characters introduced in 1998